Sybaris may refer to:

 Sybaris, an ancient city of Magna Graecia, now in Italy
Sibari, a hamlet of Cassano all'Ionio, Calabria, Italy
 Sybaris on the Traeis, a nearby ancient city founded by refugees from the above
 Sybaris (beetle), a blister beetle genus
 an alternate name for the Coscile, a river of Italy adjacent to Magna Græcia
  Sybaris, a chain of Romantic Pool Suites in the Chicago, Milwaukee, and Indianapolis areas.
 Sybaris (mythology), a man-eating beast of Greek mythology.
 Sybaris was a companion of Aeneas slain by Turnus in Book 12 (XII line 362) of The Aeneid

See also
 Sybarite (disambiguation)
 Sybris